Matthew Phillip "Matt" Gibb (born 15 January 1981) is a television presenter in Auckland, New Zealand. He is best known for presenting the children's television show Studio 2 from 2004 until 2010.

In 2015 Gibb was also a regular presenter for a segment on Kiwi Living, a New Zealand lifestyle television programme. He also fronted the Telecom campaign "Tech in a Sec" and has been known to host the weekly Lotto draw, and had a stint co-presenting the breakfast television programme Good Morning.

Career 
Gibbs first television appearance was as the host of Squirt. In 2004 he was a co-host on the popular children's show Studio 2 until the series ended in October 2010.

Gibb then worked as an on-screen producer for U Live on TVNZ U. Gibb also worked as the fill-in host and contributor on the breakfast show Good Morning. He also presented the Telecom campaign "Tech in a Sec", and occasionally hosted the weekly Lotto draw.

In 2015 Gibb began presenting pre-recorded segments about travel and unique homes on the New Zealand lifestyle programme Kiwi Living. Later that year, he announced he would be giving up his presenting work in New Zealand to move to Sydney, Australia, after his fiancée (a reporter for 1 News) landed a job as an Australian correspondent.

Gibb  was a radio co-host on The Breakfast Club on More FM, alongside Lana Searle and Gary McCormick.

Personal life 
Gibb was born and raised in Christchurch, New Zealand. He attended Burnside High School. He lived with his parents as a young adult, working for Family Planning as part of the youth education team and performing in the improvisation comedy Scared Scriptless.

Filmography

See also
 List of New Zealand television personalities

References

New Zealand television presenters
Living people
1981 births
People educated at Burnside High School